"Child in Time" is a song by Deep Purple.

Child in Time may also refer to:

 Child in Time (album), by the Ian Gillan Band
 The Child in Time, a novel by Ian McEwan
 The Child in Time (film), a British television film, an adaptation of the novel

See also
 Child of Time, a novel by Isaac Asimov and Robert Silverberg